Renaissance Learning, Inc. (also known simply as Renaissance) is a software as a service and learning analytics company that makes cloud-based, Pre-K–12 educational software and adaptive assessments. Renaissance employs about 1,000 employees in nine U.S. cities and subsidiaries in Canada, the United Kingdom, Korea, and Australia. Renaissance's solutions are used in one-third of U.S. schools and more than 90 countries around the world. 

Renaissance is known for creating Accelerated Reader, which is used in about 35,000 schools, as well as Star computer-adaptive assessments, used in more than 37,000 schools, making Star Assessments the most widely used computer-adaptive assessment in the U.S. Pre-K–12 educational market, according to company figures. According to company statistics, over 7 million reading and math Star Assessments were given over the 2021–2022 school year.

History 

Renaissance was founded in 1986 by Judith and Terrance Paul after Judith developed Accelerated Reader, originally named Read Up!, in the basement of her home in Port Edwards, Wisconsin. Judith designed Accelerated Reader to encourage her children to read more books. Read Up! changed its name to Advantage Learning Systems, Inc., in 1991 before adopting Renaissance Learning in 2001. In 2016, Renaissance re-branded and dropped “Learning” from their name.
On September 25, 1997, 2.8 million shares of Renaissance were offered for $16 a share on the Nasdaq exchange under the ticker ALSI with a market capitalization of $44.8 million. The company was publicly traded until October 2011, when Permira purchased all outstanding shares and maintained ownership of Renaissance until selling the company in 2014 to Hellman & Friedman for $1.1 billion.
CapitalG, a sister company to Google and subsidiary of Alphabet Inc., became an equity investor in Renaissance in 2014.
In May 2018 the company was acquired by private equity firm Francisco Partners.

Renaissance has grown in part to company acquisitions. In 2005, Renaissance purchased AlphaSmart for $57 million in cash and stock  and released its AlphaSmart hardware, which was discontinued in 2013. It purchased e-reading platform Subtext in June 2013. In February 2015, Renaissance acquired UClass, a cloud-based storage and content management service, for an undisclosed amount. In March 2018, Renaissance acquired myON Reader, then in October 2019, Renaissance acquired Schoolzilla. In February 2021, Renaissance acquired Nearpod and Flocabulary.

Reviews

The United States Department of Education's Institute of Education Sciences in What Works Clearinghouse, in June 2016, found Accelerated Reader to have mixed effects on comprehension for beginning readers.

As of October 2017, Renaissance products are supported by 438 scientific research studies and reviews. Of those, 312 research studies have been conducted by independent researchers, while 62 have been peer reviewed.

A 2015 study of 2.8 million students in grades 1–12 found that students who use Accelerated Reader best practices are nearly twice as likely to be college and career ready. These results held true for all grades and populations of interest (struggling readers, English learners, and students in free or reduced lunch programs) and rose with the integrity of program use.

The Council of Administrators of Special Education (CASE) endorsed Accelerated Reader 360, Accelerated Math, and MathFacts in a Flash. CASE endorsements are granted solely to the products and solutions recognized as being able to meet the needs of special education students.

Accelerated Readers critics say it limits a student's recreational reading to a list of books that fall in their book level, in order to accrue "points", and that the system trivializes books and undermines reading by reducing it to a competitive game. Susan Straight in The New York Times says, "the passion and serendipity of choosing a book at the library based on the subject or the cover of the first page is nearly gone, as well as the excitement of reading a book simply for pleasure. This is not all the fault of Renaissance, which I believe is trying to help schools encourage students to read."

References

Wisconsin Rapids, Wisconsin
Educational software companies
Companies based in Wisconsin
Private equity portfolio companies